Terminalia eriostachya, the black mastic, is a species of flowering tree in the leadwood family, Combretaceae.  It is endemic to Cuba and the Cayman Islands. It is threatened by habitat loss.

References

Trees of Cuba
Trees of the Cayman Islands
eriostachya
Endangered plants
Taxonomy articles created by Polbot